The Mad is an epithet applied to:

Haakon the Crazy or the Mad (died 1214), Norwegian earl
Othenin, Count of Montbéliard (died 1338)
Charles VI of France (1369–1422), King of France
Jan II the Mad (1435–1504), Duke of Żagań-Przewóz, Przewóz, Żagań and half-Głogów
Joanna of Castile (1479–1555), first queen regnant of Castile of Aragon, queen of Sardinia, Sicily and Naples
John II, Count of Rietberg (after 1523–1562)
Mustafa I (1600-1639), sultan of the Ottoman Empire
Ibrahim of the Ottoman Empire (1615–1648), sultan of the Ottoman Empire
Maria I of Portugal (1734–1816), first undisputed queen regnant of Portugal
Theodor Tolsdorff (1909–1978), German World War II lieutenant general

See also
Antiochus IV Epiphanes (c. 215 BC–164 BC), ruler of the Seleucid Empire sometimes called Epimanes ("the mad one")
Al-Hakim bi-Amr Allah (996–1021), called the Mad Caliph in Western literature
Odo I, Count of Vermandois, Count of Vermanois from 1080 to 1085, called "the Insane"
George III (1738–1820), King of Great Britain and of Ireland, called the Mad King
Mad King Ludwig II of Bavaria (1845–1886)
Norman the Lunatic, a ring name of Mike Shaw (1957–2010), American professional wrestler
 Dagur the Deranged, a character in the animated television series DreamWorks Dragons

Lists of people by epithet